The 1950 Tasmanian Australian National Football League (TANFL) premiership season was an Australian Rules football competition staged in Hobart, Tasmania over twenty (20) roster rounds and four (4) finals series matches between 15 April and 7 October 1950.
On 7 August 1950, the TANFL admitted the Clarence and New Norfolk District Football Clubs' as permanent members of the TANFL competition after they were admitted as probationary members in 1947.

Participating Clubs
Clarence District Football Club
Hobart Football Club
New Norfolk District Football Club
New Town District Football Club
North Hobart Football Club
Sandy Bay Football Club

1950 TANFL Club Coaches
Jack Bennett (Clarence)
Jack Sullivan (Hobart)
Bert Edwards (New Norfolk)
Roy Cazaly (New Town)
Vern Rae (North Hobart)
Jack Rogers (Sandy Bay)

TANFL Reserves Grand Final
New Town 12.14 (86) v Sandy Bay 10.10 (70) – North Hobart Oval

TANFL Under-19's Grand Final
State Schools Old Boys Football Association (SSOBFA) 
Macalburn 9.12 (66) v Buckingham 6.3 (39) – New Town Oval.
Note: Macalburn were affiliated to Hobart, Buckingham were affiliated to New Town.

State Preliminary Final
(Saturday, 7 October 1950)
Nth Launceston: 0.1 (1) | 6.5 (41) | 9.5 (59) | 14.16 (100)
Ulverstone: 4.3 (27) | 5.4 (34) | 7.8 (50) | 8.8 (56)
Attendance: 4680 at York Park

State Grand Final
(Saturday, 14 October 1950) 
Nth Launceston: 7.2 (44) | 7.3 (45) | 12.4 (76) | 14.9 (93)
Hobart Tigers: 4.1 (25) | 5.5 (35) | 5.9 (39) | 8.10 (58)
Attendance: 10,006 at North Hobart Oval

Intrastate Matches
Jubilee Shield (Saturday, 29 July 1950) 
 NTFA 17.17 (119) v TANFL 12.10 (82) – Att: 8,500 at York Park

Inter-Association Match (Saturday, 29 July 1950) 
Huon FA 16.8 (104) v TANFL 12.12 (84) – Att: 1,130 at Franklin Oval

Interstate Matches
See – 1950 Australian National Football Carnival 
Australian National Football Carnival (Wednesday, 19 July 1950) 
Tasmania 14.7 (91) v Victorian FA 9.15 (69) – Att: N/A at Brisbane Exhibition Ground

Australian National Football Carnival (Saturday, 22 July 1950) 
Sth Australia 13.14 (92) v Tasmania 8.11 (59) – Att: N/A at Brisbane Exhibition Ground

Australian National Football Carnival (Monday, 24 July 1950) 
Victoria 16.11 (107) v Tasmania 8.7 (55) – Att: N/A at Brisbane Exhibition Ground

Australian National Football Carnival (Wednesday, 26 July 1950) 
Western Australia 11.12 (78) v Tasmania 11.5 (71) – Att: N/A at Brisbane Exhibition Ground

Interstate Match (Sunday, 30 July 1950) 
Tasmania 23.16 (154) v New South Wales 13.17 (95) – Att: N/A at Trumper Park Oval, Sydney

Exhibition Match (Saturday, 29 July 1950) 
Melbourne 19.24 (138) v TANFL 8.17 (65) – Att: 4,153 at North Hobart Oval

Leading Goalkickers: TANFL
Ian Westell (Sandy Bay) – 83
Bernie Waldron (Hobart) – 67
J.Cooper (Clarence) – 47
Bobby Parsons (New Town) – 47
Albert Park (New Town) – 41

Medal Winners
Warren Smart (Sandy Bay) – William Leitch Medal
R.Toulmin (Sandy Bay) – George Watt Medal (Reserves)
John Chick (Glenorchy) – V.A Geard Medal (Under-19's)

1950 TANFL Ladder

Round 1
(Saturday, 15 April 1950)
Nth Hobart 10.14 (74) v Sandy Bay 11.3 (69) – Att: 3,386 at North Hobart Oval
New Town 9.13 (67) v Hobart 8.14 (62) – Att: 2,989 at New Town Oval
Clarence 11.6 (72) v New Norfolk 7.8 (50) – Att: 1,427 at Boyer Oval

Round 2
(Saturday, 22 April 1950)
Nth Hobart 13.15 (93) v Clarence 11.8 (74) – Att: 2,964 at North Hobart Oval
Sandy Bay 15.14 (104) v New Town 11.12 (78) – Att: 2,528 at New Town Oval
Hobart 8.17 (65) v New Norfolk 2.6 (18) – Att: 1,612 at TCA Ground

Round 3
(Saturday, 29 April 1950)
Hobart 4.13 (37) v Sandy Bay 3.10 (28) – Att: 5,619 at North Hobart Oval
New Town 21.15 (141) v Clarence 10.9 (69) – Att: 1,974 at New Town Oval
Nth Hobart 15.21 (111) v New Norfolk 6.5 (41) – Att: 1,483 at Boyer Oval

Round 4
(Saturday, 6 May 1950)
Nth Hobart 16.18 (114) v New Town 12.2 (74) – Att: 4,270 at North Hobart Oval
New Norfolk 18.3 (111) v Sandy Bay 13.12 (90) – Att: 1,308 at Queenborough Oval
Hobart 12.17 (89) v Clarence 13.6 (84) – Att: 1,151 at TCA Ground

Round 5
(Saturday, 13 May 1950)
Nth Hobart 10.12 (72) v Hobart 9.14 (68) – Att: 5,388 at North Hobart Oval
Sandy Bay 11.19 (85) v Clarence 12.8 (80) – Att: 1,420 at TCA Ground
New Norfolk 13.6 (84) v New Town 4.20 (44) – Att: 1,628 at Boyer Oval

Round 6
(Saturday, 20 May 1950)
New Norfolk 19.11 (125) v Clarence 7.12 (54) – Att: 1,954 at North Hobart Oval
Nth Hobart 10.8 (68) v Sandy Bay 7.13 (55) – Att: 2,049 at Queenborough Oval
Hobart 19.12 (126) v New Town 6.21 (57) – Att: 1,858 at TCA Ground

Round 7
(Saturday, 27 May 1950) 
New Town 13.16 (94) v Sandy Bay 12.10 (82) – Att: 4,010 at North Hobart Oval
Hobart 9.13 (67) v New Norfolk 10.5 (65) – Att: 2,251 at Boyer Oval
Nth Hobart 17.11 (113) v Clarence 8.13 (61) – Att: 1,270 at Bellerive Oval

Round 8
(Saturday, 3 June 1950)
Nth Hobart 18.17 (125) v New Norfolk 6.5 (41) – Att: 4,236 at North Hobart Oval
Hobart 12.12 (84) v Sandy Bay 11.5 (71) – Att: 2,086 at Queenborough
New Town 22.11 (143) v Clarence 10.19 (79) – Att: 1,002 at Bellerive Oval

Round 9
(Saturday, 17 June 1950) 
Sandy Bay 7.19 (61) v New Norfolk 6.11 (47) – Att: 1,988 at North Hobart Oval
Nth Hobart 10.14 (74) v New Town 8.9 (57) – Att: 3,138 at New Town Oval
Hobart 13.17 (95) v Clarence 13.4 (82) – Att: 975 at Bellerive Oval

Round 10
(Saturday, 24 June 1950) 
New Town 10.18 (78) v New Norfolk 11.6 (72) – Att: 1,909 at North Hobart Oval
Hobart 20.13 (133) v Nth Hobart 9.5 (59) – Att: 3,861 at TCA Ground
Sandy Bay 9.19 (73) v Clarence 9.10 (64) – Att: 1,314 at Queenborough Oval

Round 11
(Saturday, 1 July 1950) 
Sandy Bay 14.13 (97) v Nth Hobart 10.14 (74) – Att: 3,250 at North Hobart Oval
New Town 13.21 (99) v Hobart 8.18 (66) – Att: 2,973 at New Town Oval
New Norfolk 15.14 (104) v Clarence 7.12 (54) – Att: 995 at Bellerive Oval

Round 12
(Saturday, 8 July 1950)
Nth Hobart 10.20 (80) v Clarence 6.7 (43) – Att: 1,888 at North Hobart Oval
Sandy Bay 12.10 (82) v New Town 11.12 (78) – Att: 2,680 at Queenborough Oval
Hobart 11.14 (80) v New Norfolk 8.8 (56) – Att: 1,331 at TCA Ground

Round 13
(Saturday, 15 July 1950)
New Town 19.16 (130) v Clarence 14.13 (97) – Att: 1,787 at North Hobart Oval
Hobart 19.9 (123) v Sandy Bay 14.14 (98) – Att: 3,704 at TCA Ground
New Norfolk 11.15 (81) v Nth Hobart 12.8 (80) – Att: 1,492 at Boyer Oval

Round 14
(Saturday, 22 July 1950) 
New Town 11.10 (76) v Nth Hobart 8.11 (59) – Att: 3,257 at North Hobart Oval
Hobart 18.18 (126) v Clarence 4.9 (33) – Att: 1,118 at TCA Ground *
New Norfolk 12.14 (86) v Sandy Bay 8.9 (57) – Att: 1,504 at Boyer Oval
Note: Bernie Waldron kicked a then Hobart Football Club record of 14 goals in this match, later breaking the record again on 30 August 1952.

Round 15
(Saturday, 5 August 1950)
Hobart 4.8 (32) v Nth Hobart 1.11 (17) – Att: 2,027 at North Hobart Oval
New Norfolk 14.1 (85) v New Town 10.18 (78) – Att: 1,069 at New Town Oval
Sandy Bay 17.10 (112) v Clarence 7.13 (55) – Att: 586 at Bellerive Oval

Round 16
(Saturday, 12 August 1950)
Hobart 13.15 (93) v New Town 9.16 (70) – Att: 4,694 at North Hobart Oval
Nth Hobart 13.12 (90) v Sandy Bay 10.14 (74) – Att: 1,582 at Queenborough Oval
New Norfolk 20.21 (141) v Clarence 5.8 (38) – Att: 1,074 at Boyer Oval

Round 17
(Saturday, 19 August 1950)
New Norfolk 15.10 (100) v Hobart 9.17 (71) – Att: 5,136 at North Hobart Oval
New Town 14.19 (103) v Sandy Bay 12.7 (79) – Att: 1,783 at New Town Oval
Nth Hobart 15.15 (105) v Clarence 8.14 (62) – Att: 759 at Bellerive Oval

Round 18
(Saturday, 26 August 1950)
Nth Hobart 18.13 (121) v New Norfolk 6.11 (47) – Att: 4,329 at North Hobart Oval
Sandy Bay 11.13 (79) v Hobart 8.12 (60) – Att: 1,185 at Queenborough Oval
New Town 19.19 (133) v Clarence 4.10 (34) – Att: 726 at Bellerive Oval

Round 19
(Saturday, 2 September 1950)
Hobart 9.14 (68) v Clarence 8.7 (55) – Att: 855 at North Hobart Oval
New Town 15.14 (104) v Nth Hobart 9.14 (68) – Att: 1,988 at New Town Oval
Sandy Bay 17.15 (117) v New Norfolk 12.13 (85) – Att: 1,878 at Queenborough Oval

Round 20
(Saturday, 9 September 1950)
Sandy Bay 14.12 (96) v Clarence 5.12 (42) – Att: 1,572 at North Hobart Oval
Hobart 15.21 (111) v Nth Hobart 6.10 (46) – Att: 1,468 at TCA Ground
New Town 9.11 (65) v New Norfolk 7.11 (53) – Att: 1,371 at Boyer Oval

First Semi Final
(Saturday, 16 September 1950) 
New Town: 3.5 (23) | 11.11 (77) | 13.14 (92) | 20.19 (139)
Sandy Bay: 1.5 (11) | 2.7 (19) | 4.11 (35) | 7.11 (53)
Attendance: 8,313 at North Hobart Oval

Second Semi Final
(Saturday, 23 September 1950) 
Hobart: 3.2 (20) | 5.9 (39) | 8.13 (61) | 11.15 (81)
Nth Hobart: 1.7 (13) | 2.7 (19) | 4.10 (34) | 6.14 (50)
Attendance: 7,489 at North Hobart Oval

Preliminary Final
(Saturday, 30 September 1950) 
New Town: 4.6 (30) | 7.9 (51) | 10.15 (75) | 12.16 (88)
Nth Hobart: 1.4 (10) | 2.6 (18) | 4.8 (32) | 9.9 (63)
Attendance: 7,420 at North Hobart Oval

Grand Final
(Saturday, 7 October 1950) 
Hobart: 3.4 (22) | 6.6 (42) | 11.10 (76) | 11.12 (78)
New Town: 4.2 (26) | 7.5 (47) | 8.10 (58) | 11.10 (76)
Attendance: 12,697 at North Hobart Oval

References
All scores and statistics courtesy of the Hobart Mercury newspaper. 
Ken Pinchin: "A Century of Tasmanian Football" (1979) - Tasmanian Football League, Hobart, Tasmania.

Tasmanian Football League seasons